Chamaecrista glandulosa is a species of flowering plant in the legume family native to the Americas. Its distribution extends from Mexico to Brazil and it occurs on many Caribbean islands.

There are many varieties of this plant:
C. g. var. andicola (South America)
C. g. var. andreana (Colombia)
C. g. var. balasana (Peru)
C. g. var. brasiliensis (Brazil)
C. g. var. crystallina (Venezuela, Colombia)
C. g. var. flavicoma (Mexico, Guatemala, South America)
C. g. var. glandulosa (Jamaica)
C. g. var. mirabilis - an endangered Puerto Rico endemic formerly called Cassia mirabilis
C. g. var. parralensis (Mexico)
C. g. var. picardae (Hispaniola)
C. g. var. rapidarum (Venezuela, Colombia)
C. g. var. swartzii (Caribbean)
C. g. var. tristicula (Colombia)

References

External links
USDA Plants Profile for Chamaecrista glandulosa

glandulosa
Flora of the Caribbean
Flora of Central America
Flora of South America
Flora of Mexico
Flora without expected TNC conservation status